Knott County is a county located in the U.S. state of Kentucky. As of the 2020 census, the population was 14,251. Its county seat is Hindman. The county was formed in 1884 and is named for James Proctor Knott, Governor of Kentucky (1883–1887).  It is a prohibition or dry county. Its county seat is home to the Hindman Settlement School, founded as America's first settlement school. The Knott County town of Pippa Passes is home to Alice Lloyd College.

History
Knott County was established in 1884 from land given by Breathitt, Floyd, Letcher, and Perry counties. The 1890s-era courthouse, the second to serve the county, burned in 1929.

Geography

Adjacent counties
 Magoffin County  (north)
 Floyd County  (northeast)
 Pike County  (east)
 Letcher County  (south)
 Perry County  (southwest)
 Breathitt County  (northwest)

Summits
Big Lovely Mountain, 1,401 feet (427 m)

Demographics

As of the census of 2000, there were 17,649 people, 6,717 households, and 4,990 families residing in the county. The racial makeup of the county was 98.27% White, 0.73% Black or African American, 0.11% Native American, 0.15% Asian, 0.01% Pacific Islander, 0.12% from other races, and 0.60% from two or more races.  0.63% of the population were Hispanic or Latino of any race.

There were 6,717 households, out of which 34.40% had children under the age of 18 living with them, 57.60% were married couples living together, 12.60% had a female householder with no husband present, and 25.70% were non-families. 23.60% of all households were made up of individuals, and 9.30% had someone living alone who was 65 years of age or older.  The average household size was 2.54 and the average family size was 3.00.

In the county, the population was spread out, with 24.50% under the age of 18, 10.80% from 18 to 24, 29.00% from 25 to 44, 24.30% from 45 to 64, and 11.40% who were 65 years of age or older.  The median age was 36 years. For every 100 females there were 97.30 males.  For every 100 females age 18 and over, there were 94.10 males.

The median income for a household in the county was $20,373, and the median income for a family was $24,930. Males had a median income of $29,471 versus $21,240 for females. The per capita income for the county was $11,297.  About 26.20% of families and 31.10% of the population were below the poverty line, including 39.80% of those under age 18 and 23.10% of those age 65 or over.

Education

Knott County Schools
 Knott County Central High School
 Knott County Area Technology Center
 Beaver Creek Elementary
 Carr Creek Elementary
 Cordia School
 Emmalena Elementary
 Hindman Elementary
 Jones Fork Elementary

Private schools
 Bethel Christian Academy
 Hindman Settlement School
 June Buchanan School

Higher education
 Knott County Campus of Hazard Community and Technical College
 Alice Lloyd College

Politics
Knott County had historically voted very strongly for the Democratic Party. In 1992, 75% of Knott County residents voted for Democrat Bill Clinton for US President, the highest percentage for Clinton of any county in the state. However, in recent years, Knott County has voted more favorably for the Republican Party. In the 2008 presidential election, Republican John McCain became the first Republican to win Knott County in a presidential election by winning 52.6% of the vote to Barack Obama's 45%. Aside from Elliott County (which didn't vote Republican until 2016) and the equally historically blue Floyd County, Knott County was the last county in Kentucky outside of Fayette and Jefferson counties to switch to the GOP.

When Governor Ernie Fletcher appointed Republican Randy Thompson as County Judge Executive in 2005, it was the first time the county ever had a Republican Judge Executive. Thompson won re-election in 2006 and again in 2010, making him the first Republican to win election in a Knott County office. Congressman Hal Rogers has also won Knott County's vote in recent years. Thompson was removed from office in 2013 after being convicted of misusing public funds.

Economy

Coal companies in Knott County
 Alpha Natural Resources
 James River Coal Company

Areas of interest
Tourism is increasing in the county, especially the popularity of elk viewing. Knott County and its surrounding counties are home to 5,700 free ranging elk, the largest elk herd east of the Mississippi River. There is an ATV Training Center dedicated to the safety of ATV usage amongst riders and the Knott County Sportsplex, a sports complex which has indoor basketball courts, outside baseball fields, a soccer field, and a fitness center.

Media

Television
Hometown24

Radio
 WKCB-FM
 WKCB-AM
 WWJD-FM

Newspapers
 Troublesome Creek Times

Communities

Cities
 Hindman (county seat)
 Pippa Passes
 Vicco (part)

Unincorporated communities

 Anco
 Bath
 Bearville
 Betty
 Breeding Creek
 Carrie
 Dema (part)
 Elic
 Elmrock
 Emmalena
 Fisty
 Garner
 Handshoe
 Hollybush
 Indian Grave
 Irishman
 Jones Fork
 Kite
 Leburn
 Littcarr
 Mallie
 Mousie
 Pine Top
 Raven
 Ritchie
 Sassafras
 Slone Fork
 Soft Shell
 Spider
 Talcum
 Tina
 Topmost
 Vest
 Wiscoal

Infrastructure

Transportation
Public transportation is provided by LKLP Community Action Partnership with demand-response service and scheduled service from Hindman to Hazard.

Notable residents
 Lige Clarke (1942−1975), LGBT activist, journalist and author 
 Rebecca Gayheart (born 1971), actress and model
 Carl Dewey Perkins (1912−1984), politician and member of the United States House of Representatives
 James Still (1906–2001), author folklorist
 David Tolliver, musician; member of country band Halfway to Hazard

In popular culture
 20th Century Fox filmed several scenes in the county for a nationally released movie Fire Down Below

See also

 Dry counties
 National Register of Historic Places listings in Knott County, Kentucky
 Robinson Forest

References

Further reading

External links
 The Kentucky Highlands Project

 
Kentucky counties
Counties of Appalachia
1884 establishments in Kentucky
Populated places established in 1884